Alois Houba (17 April 1904 – 9 November 1982) was a Czech painter. His work was part of the painting event in the art competition at the 1936 Summer Olympics.

References

1904 births
1982 deaths
20th-century Czech painters
Czech male painters
Olympic competitors in art competitions
Artists from Prague
20th-century Czech male artists